The Americas Zone is one of the three zones of regional Davis Cup competition in 2014.

In the Americas Zone there are three different groups in which teams compete against each other to advance to the next group.

Participating nations

Seeds:

Remaining Nations

Draw

 relegated to Group II in 2015.
 and  advance to World Group Play-off.

First round

Ecuador vs. Venezuela

Dominican Republic vs. Uruguay

Second round

Ecuador vs. Brazil

Colombia vs. Dominican Republic

Second round playoffs

Venezuela vs. Uruguay

References

External links
Official Website

Americas Zone Group I
Davis Cup Americas Zone

it:Coppa Davis 2014 Zona Asia/Oceania Gruppo I
zh:2014年台維斯盃亞洲及大洋洲區第一級